Benjamin Davis Wilson (December 1, 1811 – March 11, 1878), commonly known as Don Benito Wilson, was an American-Mexican politician, fur trapper, and ranchero of California. Born in Tennessee, Wilson eventually settled in Alta California, became a Mexican resident, married into a prominent Californio family and acquired Rancho Jurupa. Following the American Conquest of California, Wilson served a term as Mayor of Los Angeles.

Life in California

Rancho Jurupa
Wilson came to California with the Workman-Rowland Party in 1841 seeking passage to China.

In 1842, Wilson bought a key portion of Rancho Jurupa from Juan Bandini, a section that was later named Rancho Rubidoux. Encompassing most of present-day Rubidoux, California, as well as a significant portion of downtown Riverside, Wilson became the first permanent settler in the Riverside area.  In 1844 he married his first wife, Ramona Yorba, whose father Bernardo Yorba, was the prominent Spanish (Mexican) landholder of Rancho Cañón de Santa Ana.

Wilson gained esteem and was often asked to assist with Native American affairs. Wilson accepted by becoming Justice of the Peace of the Inland Territory.

Big Bear Lake

In 1845 he was asked to pursue a group of Native Americans led by a man who escaped from the San Gabriel Mission, who stole horses from the local ranchers. The Indians drove the horses, numbering in the thousands, up to the high desert near Lucerne. In his pursuit, Wilson sent 22 men through the Cajon Pass and led another 22 into the depths of the San Bernardino Mountains. According to Trafzer, the resident Serrano let Wilson pass through their territory in pursuit of the raiders.  Wilson later sent his 22 men in pairs on a bear hunt, gathering 11 pelts. On their return trip to Jurupa, they gathered another 11 pelts.  He named the place Big Bear Lake. The lake today is known as Baldwin Lake, after Elias J. "Lucky" Baldwin, while the name Big Bear Lake was re-applied to a reservoir built nearby in 1884.

Political activities

In 1850, Wilson was elected to the Los Angeles Common Council, and a year later he became the second elected mayor of Los Angeles after California was made a state. He also served as a Los Angeles County supervisor (1853, 1861–64). He was elected to three terms of the California State Senate.

Rancho San Pascual

In 1854 Wilson established Lake Vineyard, his own ranch and winery near modern-day San Gabriel, California. He came into possession of adjoining Rancho San Pascual (present day Pasadena) through a series of complicated land deals, which began with his lending money to the Rancho's owner Manuel Garfias in 1859. In 1863 Wilson and Dr. John Strother Griffin, who had also lent Garfias money – and with whom Wilson undertook many business deals in early Los Angeles, including railways, oil exploration, real estate, farming and ranching – bought the entire rancho property outright, and diverted water from the Arroyo Seco up to the dry mesa via an aqueduct called the "Wilson Ditch."

In 1864 Wilson took the first expedition to a high peak of the San Gabriel Mountains, which was later named Mount Wilson. He hoped to harvest timber there for the making of wine vats, but he found the wood inadequate. The Wilson Trail became a popular one or two-day hike to the crest of the San Gabriel Mountains by local residents for years to come.

In 1873, Wilson and Griffin subdivided their land (with Griffin getting almost  of the property, but Wilson retaining some better landeast of current Fair Oaks Avenue, near his Lake Vineyard property). Griffin then sold 2,500 acres (10 km) of his property to the "Indiana Colony," represented by Daniel M. Berry. In 1876, after the Colony had sold most of its allotted land and established what became the City of Pasadena, Wilson began subdividing and developing his adjacent landholdings which became the eastern side of the new settlement.

Legacy
He gave several acres of property to his son-in-law James de Barth Shorb which he named San Marino, and developed other parts of the land as Alhambra, where he is enshrined as a statue in Renaissance Plaza. Wilson's first wife died in 1849, after which time he married the widow Margaret Hereford. They had four children, of whom one daughter Ruth married George Smith Patton and had a son who became the World War II General George S. Patton Jr. The Pattons later purchased Lake Vineyard. Wilson died at the ranch in 1878 and was buried in San Gabriel Cemetery. The last of his land holdings in the downtown Pasadena area were bequeathed to Central School on South Fair Oaks Avenue.

Mount Wilson, a metromedia center (television and radio transmission towers) for the greater Los Angeles area, is the most famous monument to Benjamin Wilson. Wilson Avenue in Pasadena and Don Benito School of the Pasadena Unified School District also honor his name.

References

Bibliography
 
 
Google Bookshelf, The Pattons
Wilson, Benjamin D. (1852). Indians of Southern California in 1852, ed. John W. Caughey (San Marino: Huntington Library, 1952). 

California pioneers
Land owners from California
Mayors of Los Angeles
Los Angeles Common Council (1850–1889) members
19th-century American politicians
Los Angeles County Board of Supervisors
American emigrants to Mexico
Naturalized citizens of Mexican California
1811 births
1878 deaths
People from Pasadena, California
People from the San Gabriel Valley
People from Wilson County, Tennessee
History of Los Angeles County, California
History of Pasadena, California
History of Riverside, California
Altadena, California
Sierra Madre, California
San Gabriel Mountains
19th century in Los Angeles
California state senators
19th-century American businesspeople